Alexander (I) Mavrocordatos (1742 – 27 March 1812), nicknamed Delibey for his cunning, was a Phanariote who served as Prince of Moldavia from 1782 to 1785.

Life 
Son of Constantine Mavrocordatos and Catherine Rosetti, he succeeded in May 1782 to Constantine Mourouzis, deposed by the Sublime Porte following the intrigues of the Russian ambassador in Constantinople. He owes his appointment to this same ambassador.

Mavrocordatos was dismissed in January 1785 at the request of Rajtschewitsch, consul of Austria in Moldavia, who complained to the Ottoman government to have been badly received by Mavrocordatos, despite being the representative of the Holy Roman Emperor. But it is possible that in fact this is only one aspect of the Austro-Russian struggle for influence in Moldavia: the Habsburgs already had occupied Bukovina since 1775, and the Russian czars coveted the Budjak and the mouths of the Danube, and each Empire advanced its pawns in the region.

According to Alexandre A.C. Sturdza, Mavrocordatos was known for his "versatility and difficult character" which gave rise to his Turkish nickname "Delibey".

Sources 
 Alexandru Dimitrie Xenopol Histoire des Roumains de la Dacie trajane : Depuis les origines jusqu'à l'union des principautés. E Leroux Paris (1896).
 Alexandre A.C. Sturdza L'Europe Orientale et le rôle historique des Maurocordato (1660-1830) Librairie Plon Paris (1913), p. 243-245.
 Nicolas Iorga Histoire des Roumains et de la romanité orientale. (1920)
  Constantin C. Giurescu & Dinu C. Giurescu, Istoria Românilor Volume III (depuis 1606), Editura Științifică și Enciclopedică, București, 1977.
 Mihail Dimitri Sturdza, Dictionnaire historique et généalogique des grandes familles de Grèce, d'Albanie et de Constantinople, M.-D. Sturdza, Paris, chez l'auteur, 1983 .
 Jean-Michel Cantacuzène, Mille ans dans les Balkans, Éditions Christian, Paris, 1992. 
 Gilles Veinstein, Les Ottomans et la mort (1996) .
 Joëlle Dalegre Grecs et Ottomans 1453-1923. De la chute de Constantinople à la fin de l'Empire ottoman, Éditions L'Harmattan Paris (2002)  .
 Jean Nouzille La Moldavie, Histoire tragique d'une région européenne, Ed. Bieler (2004), .
 Traian Sandu, Histoire de la Roumanie, Éditions Perrin (2008).

Rulers of Moldavia
1742 births
1812 deaths
Alexander 01
18th-century Greek people
19th-century Greek people
18th-century people from the Ottoman Empire
19th-century people from the Ottoman Empire
Constantinopolitan Greeks